Great Britain, represented by the British Olympic Association (BOA), competed at the 2008 Summer Olympics in Beijing, China. The United Kingdom was represented by the British Olympic Association (BOA), and the team of selected athletes was officially known as Team GB. Britain is one of only five NOCs to have competed in every modern Summer Olympic Games since 1896. The delegation of 547 people included 311 competitors – 168 men, 143 women – and 236 officials. The team was made up of athletes from the whole United Kingdom including Northern Ireland (whose people may elect to hold Irish citizenship and are able to be selected to represent either Great Britain or Ireland at the Olympics). Additionally some British overseas territories compete separately from Britain in Olympic competition.

Great Britain's medal performance at the 2008 Summer Olympics was its best in a century; at the close of the Games, the total medal count, 47, was also the fourth highest Great Britain had ever achieved. Only its performance at the 1908 Summer Olympics, which Britain hosted in London, resulted in more gold medals being awarded. Following retests of doping samples in 2016 in connection with the Russian doping scandal, four further medals, all bronze, were awarded in athletics, retrospectively increasing the total gained to 51. As of 1 July 2020, the award of the bronze medals to both the Men's and Women's 4 × 400 metres relay teams and the upgrade of Goldie Sayers to bronze in the Women's javelin, confirmed by the Court of Arbitration for Sport (CAS), brought the official medal total to 50, after which the confirmation of Kelly Sotherton receiving her second reallocated bronze medal in the Women's Heptathlon (having been part of the Women's 4 × 400 metre team) took the total number of medals won to 51.

Great Britain finished 4th overall in the medal tables, a target previously set by UK Sport, the public body responsible for distributing funding to elite sport, for the 2012 Games. UK Sport considered whether to target 3rd place in the 2012 Games, which was hosted by the United Kingdom in London.

The outstanding individual achievement for a British athlete at the Games was when cyclist Chris Hoy became the first British athlete in 100 years to win three gold medals at a single Olympic Games.

Because London was to be host city of the 2012 Summer Olympics, a British segment featuring football star David Beckham was performed during the closing ceremony.

Medallists

The following British competitors won medals at the Games, all dates are August 2008. In the 'by discipline' sections below, medallists' names are in bold.

| width="78%" align="left" valign="top" |

| width="22%" align="left" valign="top" |

Multiple medallists
The following Team GB competitors won multiple medals at the 2008 Olympic Games.

Targets
In June 2008, UK Sport, which distributes National Lottery funding to elite sport, published its expectations for the Games. It identified 41 potential medals to target and expected to win 35 of them, including 10 to 12 gold medals and to finish 8th in the overall medal table. Team GB exceeded the gold medal expectations on 19 August when Paul Goodison earned Britain's 13th gold medal in the men's Laser class.  The minimum medal target, of 35 medals, was passed on 20 August when they claimed their 36th medal – a bronze in the women's RS:X, won by Bryony Shaw. The total medal target was equalled when canoeist Tim Brabants took gold in the men's 1000 m K-1 claiming Britain's 41st physical medal (three further medals were guaranteed in boxing at the time). They later exceeded the total number of targeted medals when Heather Fell secured the silver in women's modern pentathlon.

The medals claimed were not all ones that had been targeted, with Team GB falling short of targets in some disciplines whilst exceeding them in others. Nine out of seventeen disciplines met their targets.
The British cyclists, for example doubled their medal target on 19 August when Victoria Pendleton won Britain's 12th cycling medal, a gold in the women's sprint. A further two medals were already guaranteed at this stage in the men's individual sprint, where gold and silver were soon won by Chris Hoy and Jason Kenny respectively. In all Team GB won seven of the ten gold medals up for grabs at the velodrome. The swimmers also managed to double the targeted number of medals in their sport when David Davies won the team's sixth swimming medal – a silver medal in the men's 10 km open water marathon on 21 August. Despite the men's and women's archery teams having come second and third respectively at the 2007 world championships, British archers were unable to win either of their targeted medals. This led to criticism of the tactics used by head coach Peter Suk from members of the team.

Archery

At the 2007 World Outdoor Target Championships, Great Britain's men's team placed second and its women's team placed third. This qualified the nation to send full teams of three men and three women to the Olympics.

Men

Women

Athletics

The initial squad was selected for the British team on 14 July; however, the final team was not confirmed until the outcome of a court case involving Dwain Chambers. Under the rules of the BOA, Chambers had been banned from future Games after testing positive for the steroid THG in 2003. His appeal to overturn that ban, on the grounds that it was an unfair restraint of trade, failed and he was omitted from the squad. The team included former Olympic medal winners Marlon Devonish and Kelly Sotherton, as well as former Olympic individual finalists Joanne Pavey, Paula Radcliffe, Helen Clitheroe and Tasha Danvers. Women's marathon world record holder Paula Radcliffe faced a battle to be fit for the Games due to a stress fracture in her left thigh. She eventually proved fit enough to start the race but struggled to finish in 23rd position.

A total of four medals were won, one gold, two silver and one bronze. UK Athletics performance director Dave Collins stood down after the Games. This was due in part to the team's failure to meet the UK Sport target of winning five medals,. Ironically, a series of retests ordered in the wake of the Russian doping scandal in 2015 and 2016 found that Great Britain athletes had been deprived of medals in a further four events by athletes later confirmed to have doped – the women's heptathlon (Kelly Sotherton), the men's and women's 4 x 400-metre relay teams and women's javelin (Goldie Sayers). When these medals are redistributed, Great Britain's 2008 athletics total of eight medals will be its most successful since the second world war, and 75% over target.

Men
Track & road events

* Qualified for the team, but did not compete in any of the rounds

Field events

Combined events – Decathlon

Women
Track & road events

* Qualified for the team, but did not compete in any of the rounds

Field events

Combined events – Heptathlon

* The athlete who finished in second place, Lyudmila Blonska of the Ukraine, tested positive for a banned substance. Both the A and the B tests were positive, therefore Blonska was stripped of her silver medal, and both British heptathletes moved up a position.

Badminton

Six British badminton players went to the Games, competing in four out of the five badminton events. They did not win any medals, thus failing to reach the one medal target set by UK Sport. The mixed doubles pairing of Gail Emms and Nathan Robertson, who won silver in the 2004 tournament, progressed furthest amongst the British athletes, reaching the quarterfinals.

Boxing

A total of eight boxers qualified. David Price and Tony Jeffries both won bronze medals in the super heavyweight and light heavyweight divisions respectively. Middleweight James DeGale won a gold medal in the middleweight class. It was the first time that Great Britain has won more than one medal in boxing in a single games since 1972, and the best result for Great Britain in boxing since 1956.

Canoeing

Seven competitors joined Team GB for the canoeing events, with four in the flatwater and three in the slalom. Anna Hemmings and Jessica Walker, in the K-2 kayaking pairs, were added later after complications with the Spanish team. Three medals were won, two by Tim Brabants, who had previously won a bronze at the 2000 Olympics in Sydney. This exceeded the target of two set by UK Sport.

Slalom

Sprint

Qualification Legend: QS = Qualify to semi-final; QF = Qualify directly to final

Cycling

Team GB's cycling squad for Beijing totalled twenty five entrants in the four disciplines. Included were two reigning Olympic track cycling champions, Chris Hoy and Bradley Wiggins, plus a further two medal winners from 2004, as well as several reigning track world champions. Great Britain won fourteen cycling medals (eight gold, four silver and two bronze) in total to top the cycling medal table. The Cycling team won the BBC Sports team of the year award and was nominated for Laureus World team of the year.

On the track Mark Cavendish was the only member of the squad of fourteen not to win at least one medal. Chris Hoy became Scotland's most successful Olympic competitor ever, and the first Briton to win three gold medals at a single Olympic Games since Henry Taylor in 1908. His success resulted in the velodrome for the 2014 Commonwealth Games in Glasgow being named in his honour. Rebecca Romero became the first British woman to win a medal in two different Olympic sports by following her silver medal in the quadruple sculls rowing in 2004 with gold in the women's individual pursuit.

In the debut appearance of BMX events at the Olympics, world champion Shanaze Reade finished out of the medals after crashing out of the women's final. Reade had been unbeaten all year and was the favourite to win the women's title.

On the road Nicole Cooke's win in the women's road race provided the first Olympic gold for an athlete from Wales since Richard Meade in 1972.

Road
Men

Women

Track
Sprint

Pursuit

Keirin

Omnium

Mountain biking

BMX

Diving

A total of ten divers were part of Team GB in the individual and synchronised diving events, including 14-year-old Tom Daley, the 2008 European 10 m champion and one of the youngest athletes to ever compete for Great Britain at an Olympics.

Men

Women

Equestrian

A total of twelve entrants competed for Team GB in the three equestrian disciplines that took place in Hong Kong. Zara Phillips, the reigning world eventing champion and granddaughter of Queen Elizabeth II, had been included in the squad until her horse, Toytown, sustained an injury, which meant she missed her second successive Olympics.

Dressage

(Total scores are the average of qualifying round 2 and freestyle final for the individual competition, and average of individual round 1 scores for the team competition.)

Eventing

# – Indicates that points do not count in team total

Show jumping

* On 21 August, four horses from Brazil, Germany, Ireland and Norway tested positive for a banned substance. The riders were subsequently disqualified from the individual competition and if the B samples test positive then Brazil, Germany and Norway will be disqualified from the team competition and Great Britain will move into 5th place.

Fencing

Great Britain qualified three fencers for the fencing competition. Two of these came from the re-allocation of places by the Fédération Internationale d'Escrime (FIE), the governing body for Olympic fencing, after the withdrawal of other fencers.

Men

Women

Field hockey

Men's tournament

The Great Britain men's team qualified for the men's Olympic field hockey tournament after a must-win game against India in the final of the Olympic qualifying event. Great Britain was drawn in Group B of the Olympic tournament based on world rankings on 18 April 2008. Having finished 3rd in the pool the team went on to finish 5th overall, beating South Korea in the 5th vs. 6th place playoff. Matt Daly was the top scorer for the team with three goals.

Team roster

Group play

Classification match for 5th/6th place

Women's tournament

The Great Britain Women's team qualified for the women's Olympic field hockey tournament during the 2007 Women's EuroHockey Nations Championship. Great Britain was drawn in Group B of the Olympic tournament based on world rankings on 5 May 2008. Having finished 3rd in the pool and proceeded to the 5th and 6th place classification match where they lost to Australia. Crista Cullen was the team's top scorer in the tournament with 3 goals.

Team roster

Group play

Classification match for 5th/6th place

Gymnastics

Team GB entered nine gymnasts into the artistic and trampoline events. Louis Smith, in winning the bronze medal in the men's pommel horse, became the first ever British gymnast to win an individual apparatus medal in gymnastics, and the first Briton to win any individual gymnastics medal since Walter Tysall won men's all-around medal in 1908. Laura Jones was originally chosen for the artistic gymnastics but, due to a slipped disc in her back, she was replaced by the reserve Imogen Cairns.

Artistic
Men

Women
Team

Individual finals

The result of the uneven bars final, in which Britain's Beth Tweddle placed 4th, was called into question after documents were found that seemed to say that Chinese gymnasts He Kexin and Yang Yilin were only 14, and therefore under the age required to compete, at the time of the games. An investigation into their ages was launched by the IOC to determine whether it was necessary to disqualify them, thus Tweddle's standing could have been changed to 2nd, giving her a silver medal. After a five-and-a-half-week investigation the Chinese athletes were cleared and the original results allowed to stand.

Trampoline
 Claire Wright was the only British competitor on the trampoline.

Judo

Team GB was represented by seven athletes in the Judo events. No British Judoka made it past the quarterfinal stages of competition or through to the medal match of the repechage, meaning the team failed to meet the two medal target set by UK Sport.

Men

Women

Modern pentathlon

Team GB sent the maximum allowance of four competitors for the modern pentathlon events in Beijing. For the first time since 1996, the team had entrants in the men's competition.

Rowing

There were 43 rowers in Team GB, the most since qualifying quotas were introduced after the 1992 Summer Olympics. Crews were fielded in 12 out of a possible 14 events making Team GB the fourth biggest team. Medals were won in 6 events, which meant that GB topped the rowing medal table.
The medals won included gold in the coxless four, for the third successive games, and Zac Purchase and Mark Hunter winning Great Britain's first ever lightweight rowing Olympic medal in the men's lightweight double sculls.

Men

Women

Qualification Legend: FA=Final A (medal); FB=Final B (non-medal); FC=Final C (non-medal); FD=Final D (non-medal); FE=Final E (non-medal); FF=Final F (non-medal); SA/B=Semifinals A/B; SC/D=Semifinals C/D; SE/F=Semifinals E/F; QF=Quarterfinals; R=Repechage

* Substitutes in final because of illness: Louisa Reeve for Howard and Alice Freeman for Knowles

Sailing

Great Britain entered crews in all 11 sailing events at the Games. The team finished top of the sailing medal table, with six medals won, thus exceeding the target of four set by UK Sport. Ben Ainslie won a gold medal for the third successive Games to become the most decorated British Olympic sailor of all time.

Men

Women

Open

M = Medal race; EL = Eliminated – did not advance into the medal race; CAN = Race cancelled; OCS = On the course side of the starting line;

Shooting

Team GB had a total of five competitors for the shooting disciplines at the 2008 Olympics, with four entered in the shotgun events and one in the rifle events.

Men

Women

Swimming

Thirty-seven athletes represented Team GB in the swimming events. Selection followed the 2008 British Olympic Swimming Trials in Sheffield in April, with open water event swimmers selected after performance in the 2008 World Open Water Swimming Championships, in Seville, Spain. In winning six medals (two gold, two silver and two bronze) the team bettered the target of three medals set by UK Sport. The most successful swimmer was Rebecca Adlington who won two gold medals. Her 400 m freestyle success was Britain's first Olympic swimming title since 1988, and the first swimming gold by a British woman since 1960. Her second gold, in the 800 m freestyle, meant she also equalled the best performance by a British woman, from any sport, at the summer Olympics and was the best swimming performance by a Briton at the Olympics for 100 years.

Men

Qualifiers for the latter rounds (Q) of all events were decided on a time only basis, therefore positions shown are overall results versus competitors in all heats.

Women

Qualifiers for the latter rounds (Q) of all events were decided on a time only basis, therefore positions shown are overall results versus competitors in all heats.

Synchronised swimming

Team GB was represented by two athletes in synchronised swimming, competing in the duet event.

Taekwondo

Team GB entered three athletes into the taekwondo competition in Beijing. Sarah Stevenson won Team GB's first ever medal in Olympic taekwondo – a bronze in the women's +67 kg.

* After a successful appeal by the British, judges reversed the result of the match, granting Sarah Stevenson two points for a final round kick to her opponent's head which the judges had previously missed. The reversal of the decision, after video footage was considered, is thought to be a first for the sport. Another British hopeful, Aaron Cook, was also unhappy with the judges after losing out on bronze in the men's −80 kg.

Tennis

The Murray brothers were the sole tennis players on Team GB. Andy Murray qualified due to his world ranking and Jamie Murray was nominated for the doubles by the International Tennis Federation, the governing body of world tennis.

Triathlon

A total of five competitors were selected by Team GB for the triathlon events in Beijing, with three in the men's event and two in the women's. Four qualified through the Olympic Qualification rankings of the International Triathlon Union, the body responsible for organising official world championship series races, while Helen Tucker qualified by winning the 2008 World Championships.

Weightlifting

The only British weightlifter to qualify for the games was Michaela Breeze who competed in her second Olympic Games. She battled through a back injury to finish 15th out of 20 competitors in her event.

Sports not contested in Beijing
British representatives participated in the qualifying tournaments of a number of other Olympic sports in the lead up to the 2008 games, only for events outside of the athletes' control to prevent their further participation in the games.

Baseball

The GB baseball team finished 2nd in the 2007 European Baseball Championship behind the Netherlands, guaranteeing them a place at the Olympic qualifying tournament in Taiwan. However, a lack of funding forced the team to withdraw, with their place being taken by Germany.

Football

The award of the 2012 Summer Olympics to London has brought the question of British participation in the football tournaments to the fore, given that there is traditionally no single United Kingdom national team. The British Olympic Association initially refused to rule out the possibility of entry for 2008, but were unable to come to an agreement with the Scottish Football Association. The 2007 European Under-21 Championship, which served as the European qualifying tournament for the men's competition, saw the England U21 team reach the semi-finals, which would have meant a place at the Olympics. Because at the Olympics the team is representative of the entire UK, England were thus prevented from taking this place, with instead a play-off taking place between Portugal and Italy. A similar situation occurred with the England Women's team who, by virtue of being one of the top three European sides at the 2007 World Cup, would have been granted a place at the Olympics. Instead, there was a play-off between Denmark and Sweden.

Media coverage
The main rights to Olympic coverage in the United Kingdom are held by the BBC, under the Ofcom Code on Sports and Other Listed and Designated Events. An extensive range of broadcasting options was used to provide over 2,500 hours of coverage.

For the first time, Olympic coverage was broadcast in high-definition on BBC HD. Digital television viewers had access to up to six streamed channels covering the games on BBC Red Button, whilst the BBC's website permitted British broadband users to view live streams from a variety of events. Live broadcasts ran overnight and throughout the day on BBC One and BBC Two, starting at 0200 daily; a highlights programme, Games Today, was broadcast on BBC One following the close of each day's events.

The opening and closing ceremonies were anchored by Sue Barker and Huw Edwards, whilst general coverage was anchored (at various times of the day) by Adrian Chiles, Clare Balding, Gabby Logan, Jake Humphrey, Sue Barker, Hazel Irvine and John Inverdale. Former Olympic contenders – including gold medallists Michael Johnson, Shirley Robertson, Adrian Moorhouse, Steve Redgrave, Jonathan Edwards and Chris Boardman – provided analysis.

Eurosport also broadcast coverage of the Games viewable in the United Kingdom. In accordance with the ITC Code, it can show live events, provided that such events can also be broadcast by the BBC (although the BBC can choose not to do so).

Radio coverage was provided by BBC Radio 5 Live, and BBC Radio 5 Live Sports Extra on digital radio.

See also
 Great Britain at the 2008 Summer Paralympics

Notes

General
 
Specific

External links
British Olympic Association – and their Team GB pages

Nations at the 2008 Summer Olympics
2008
Summer Olympics